380 may refer to:
 380 (number), the natural number and/or integer
 Western-calendar years:
 380 (AD or CE)
 380 BC
 Products:
 Airbus A380, double-deck, four-engined airliner
 380 bulb, 12V dual-brightness (21W/5W, typically automotive) light bulb
 Named for nominal diameter:
 .380 ACP, a rimless, straight-walled pistol cartridge
 
 Hung Shui Kiu stop, Hong Kong; station code